Yi Mae-chang (1573-1610), born Yi Hyang-geum(李香今), was a famed kisaeng of the Buan area during the Joseon Dynasty. She was noted for her talent in playing the geomungo (a zither-like instrument related to the Chinese Guqin 古琴) and composing sijo and other poetry.  As Hwang Jin-i was known as one of the three wonders of Songdo, Mae-chang was known as one of the three wonders of Byeoksan.

Her grave is preserved in Buan County, Jeollabuk-do, South Korea.

See also
Korean culture

References
Hwang, Won-gap (황원갑). (1997).  한국사를 바꾼 여인들 (Hanguksareul bakkun yeoindeul) (The women who changed Korean history). Seoul:  책이있는마을.  

Kisaeng
16th-century Korean people
1573 births
1610 deaths
17th-century Korean people
17th-century Korean women
16th-century Korean women